Louroux-Hodement is a former commune in the Allier department in central France. On 1 January 2016, it was merged into the new commune Haut-Bocage.

Population

See also
Communes of the Allier department

References

Former communes of Allier
Allier communes articles needing translation from French Wikipedia
Populated places disestablished in 2016